Nguyễn Tường Lân (阮祥麟, 1906–1946) was a Vietnamese painter.

Works
Many of his works are in the Vietnam National Museum of Fine Arts, Hanoi:

Gallery

References

1906 births
1946 deaths
20th-century Vietnamese painters